Bertalan Mandzák (born 21 July 1957) is a Hungarian weightlifter. He competed in the men's light heavyweight event at the 1980 Summer Olympics.

References

External links
 

1957 births
Living people
Hungarian male weightlifters
Olympic weightlifters of Hungary
Weightlifters at the 1980 Summer Olympics
People from Vásárosnamény
World Weightlifting Championships medalists
Sportspeople from Szabolcs-Szatmár-Bereg County
20th-century Hungarian people